Tully's Castle is a castle and a National Monument in Clondalkin, Ireland.

Location

Tully's Castle is found on Monastery Road, Clondalkin.

History

Tully's Castle consists of a tall narrow tower (perhaps 16th century) and part of an adjoining building on its northwest side (maybe 17th century). There are two door-like apertures on its southwest side. All of the window openings in the tower are narrow, and most of them are blocked. Although the crenellations are damaged, enough remains to show that they were of the Irish style. There is a row of weeper openings at roof level. The tower look as if it may have been part of a larger tower house, possibly housing the stairs or the garderobe. The ruins now form part of the garden wall of a modern house. Given the unstable nature of Ireland in the seventeenth century, and particularly raids by the Byrnes on this part of Dublin, such constructions offered their owners security. The Pale.

The castle was owned by the Tully family during the 18th and 19th centuries.

References

National Monuments in County Dublin
Castles in South Dublin (county)